Kasinovsky is a rural locality (a settlement) in Nizhnemedveditsky Selsoviet Rural Settlement, Kursky District, Kursk Oblast, Russia. Population:

Geography 
The settlement is located 94 km from the Russia–Ukraine border, in the neighborhood of the northern border of the district center – the town Kursk, 6 km from the selsoviet center – Verkhnyaya Medveditsa.

 Climate
Kasinovsky has a warm-summer humid continental climate (Dfb in the Köppen climate classification).

Transport 
Kasinovsky is located on the federal route  Crimea Highway (a part of the European route ), 8.5 km from the nearest railway station Kursk (railway lines: Oryol – Kursk, Kursk – 146 km and Lgov-I – Kursk).

The rural locality is situated 11 km from Kursk Vostochny Airport, 131 km from Belgorod International Airport and 213 km from Voronezh Peter the Great Airport.

References

Notes

Sources

Rural localities in Kursky District, Kursk Oblast